Kajaki is a village in Afghanistan.

Kajaki may also refer to:

Kajaki District, Afghanistan
Kajaki Dam, Afghanistan
Kajaki (film), a 2014 British docudrama